Sarah Stillman is an American professor and journalist focusing on immigration policy and the criminal justice system. She won a 2012 George Polk Award, and 2012 Hillman Prize. In 2016, she was named a MacArthur Fellow.

Life
Stillman graduated from Georgetown Day School in Washington, D.C. and graduated from Yale University in 2006. While in college, she founded and edited an interdisciplinary feminist journal, Manifesta, and co-directed the Student Legal Action Movement, a group devoted to reforming the American prison system.

Stillman was a Marshall Scholar at Oxford University. In 2009, she was embedded with the 116th Military Police Company.

She teaches at New York University and Yale University. She is also a staff writer for the New Yorker.

Awards
In 2005, Stillman was awarded the Elie Wiesel Prize in Ethics.

Stillman also won the 2012 National Magazine Award for Public Interest for her reporting from Iraq and Afghanistan on labor abuses and human trafficking on United States military bases.

She is also the recipient of the Overseas Press Club's Joe and Laurie Dine Award for international human-rights reporting, the Hillman Prize for Magazine Journalism, and the Michael Kelly Award.

In 2016, the John D. and Catherine T. MacArthur Foundation awarded Stillman a MacArthur fellowship.

Selected bibliography

References

External links
 An interview with Alex Carp at Guernica magazine
Official website

American women journalists
Yale University alumni
George Polk Award recipients
Marshall Scholars
Living people
New York University faculty
The New Yorker staff writers
MacArthur Fellows
1984 births
Georgetown Day School alumni
American women academics
21st-century American women